Shwethalyaung Pagoda is a Buddhist temple in Kyaukse, Mandalay Region, Myanmar. It is located on top of the Shwethalyaung Hill. The pagoda was built by King Anawrahta of Bagan and enshrined the replica of the Buddha's teeth.

History
King Anawratha of Pagan obtained several Buddhist relics on a trip to China. Upon his return to Pagan, he decided to build a pagoda to house the precious relics. He strapped the replica of the Buddha's teeth to the back of his white elephant Sinma Yintha and told the elephant to choose a suitable spot for the new pagoda. When the elephant stopped in the two hills, named Shwethalyaung and Pyat Kha Yway, the monarch ordered the construction of pagodas on each summit and enshrined the relic at Shwethalyaung Pagoda. To honor the royal elephants, a festival named Kyaukse elephant dance festival is held every year at the foot of Shwethalyaung Hill.

References 

Buildings and structures in Mandalay Region
Buddhist pilgrimage sites in Myanmar
Buddhist temples in Myanmar
11th-century Buddhist temples